Teosintes are several wild species of grass in the genus Zea which are critical components of maize evolution.

Teosinte  may also refer to:
Zea diploperennis, the diploperennial teosinte
Zea luxurians, a teosinte found in Guatemala, Honduras and Nicaragua
Zea nicaraguensis, a phenotypically distinctive, threatened teosinte
Zea perennis, the perennial teosinte
Dioon mejiae, a species of cycad that is native to Honduras and Nicaragua

See also
Tripsacum, gamagrass, a genus of grass plants native to the Western Hemisphere
Dioon, a genus of cycads native to Mexico and Central America
Zea (disambiguation)